S. Ramadoss is an Indian politician. He is the founder of the Pattali Makkal Katchi, an Indian political party.

Vanniyar reservation protest

In 1987, the Vanniyar Sangham under Ramadoss organized the 1987 Vanniyar reservation agitation demanding MBC status for Vanniyars. At the peak of the protests, the state was paralysed for a week when lakhs of trees were felled, highways blocked and damaged and more than 1400 houses of the Dalit community burned down. The police under the M G Ramchandran (MGR) led AIADMK government shot down 21 protestors. Later in 1989, the DMK government under M. Karunanidhi granted them 20 percent reservation under the Most backward class. The Pattali Makkal Katchi, founded by S. Ramadoss on 16 July 1989, emerged from these protests.

Controversy

Threatening journalists 
S Ramadoss is known for using unparliamentary language in press meets and public meetings. In June 2019 he stoked a controversy, saying that he would kill journalists who question him about hundreds of trees cut down by his party workers during his arrest by the J Jayalalithaa government. He said, "if we protest again we will not cut trees but hack down those who ask these questions, and throw their mangled bodies across the road." He also called the journalists "dogs" and "Kammanati pasanga", a derogatory phrase used for 'son of widow'.

Anti-Dalit campaign
Ramadoss is notorious for his anti-Dalit rhetoric and violence. In December 2012, Ramadoss initiated a controversial campaign to prevent Dalit men from marrying non-Dalit women, especially those women who belong to the Vanniyar community. In Tamil Nadu, many political parties wanted legal action against him. In an event in 2010, he said, "Dalit men sporting jeans, t-shirts and fancy glasses lure our women into marriages that don't work." M. Karunanidhi asked the government of the state to "act against those stirring up a caste passion". The campaign provoked the 2012 Dharmapuri violence, where hundreds of Dalit houses were charred by arsonists. Ramadoss strongly campaigned for raising women's legal age of marriage to 21 as he believes upper caste women in their late teenage are easy targets for Dalit men. Ramadoss convened a meeting with leaders representing intermediate castes to crusade against SC/ST Act, a law that criminalizes caste discrimination, alleging that Dalits misuse the law and register false cases to settle personal scores. In 2013, he was arrested for inciting caste riots. Jayalalitha blamed PMK and Vanniyar Sangam for the 2013 Marakkanam violence. Following his arrest, PMK organised a statewide violent protest that resulted in the injury of several people and losses to public property. Viduthalai Chiruthaigal Katchi (VCK) accused PMK of murdering two Dalit youths in Arrakonam in April 2021.

Notes

References

External links
S Ramadoss Official Profile

Pattali Makkal Katchi politicians
1939 births
Living people
People from Viluppuram district
Indian political party founders
Indian actor-politicians